Cry of Fear is a survival horror game developed by independent Swedish studio Team Psykskallar. Though originally a mod for the video game Half-Life in 2012, it was released as a standalone product the following year.

Development
Cry of Fear began development in 2008. The mod was delayed several times due to time limitations before being released in 2012. During the 4 years of development of Cry of Fear, many ideas were scrapped while others were improved. For example, the phone's flashlight was initially made to illuminate an area around the player. This was later changed to illuminate the area in front of the player. The inventory system was also reduced from 12 slots to 6. At its beginning, Cry of Fear used the standard Half-Life renderer which was later replaced by one from Paranoia, another popular Half-Life modification. Changing the renderer allowed the developers to bypass some older limits and add new engine effects such as texture bump mapping, specular reflection and 3D skyboxes.

Gameplay
The player controls Simon Henriksson, a 19‑year‑old who wakes up in an alley shortly after being hit by a car. The player must navigate the city solving puzzles and fighting monsters to progress. The game switches between normal gameplay levels representing the city and surrounding areas, and "nightmare" levels, similar to those found in the Silent Hill series of games.

Cry of Fear features many unique mechanics, such as the limited inventory system, which allows the player to carry only 6 items at a time and does not pause the game while the inventory screen is open. Another unique mechanic is the ability to dual-wield inventory items, allowing the use of two weapons at a time, or one weapon and a light source. Item combination is also possible from the inventory screen. Health is recovered by the use of morphine syringes, which can blur the player's vision if overused. Stamina is consumed through strenuous actions such as running and jumping, and can be recovered by resting or the use of morphine syringes.

A separate co-op campaign is also available for up to four players, following a parallel plot where the players control a group of police officers that also get trapped in the nightmare world while investigating Simon.

Some days before Cry of Fears anniversary, Valve released a Half-Life update for Linux compatibility, making changes in the folders and engine. This update made several Half-Life mods, including Cry of Fear, incompatible with the base game. Team Psykskallar decided that, since no more could be done for the mod itself, they would finish a standalone version. Confusion due to Valve regarding Cry of Fears status as freeware caused the game to be delayed until April 25, 2013.

Plot
The story begins in a dark and gloomy city in Sweden, with Simon waking up in an alley after a car strikes him as he is trying to help an injured man. Waking up in an alley, Simon tries to make his way home, but deformed monsters attack him. After failing to call the police, Simon receives a text from a man pleading for help. 

When he enters and searches an apartment block, he finds the man dead in his bathtub. Progressing further, as the apartment building slowly grows more run-down (and eventually covered in blood), a monster attacks him with a chainsaw that decapitates itself upon defeat, prompting Simon to vomit and pass out. 

He wakes up near a cryptic and violent doctor who says he cannot trust Simon. After exploring the city and facing threats along the way, he finds Sophie, his childhood friend, and love interest, on a rooftop. Simon attempts to confess his love to her, but she rejects his advances and commits suicide by jumping off the roof.

A monster known as Carcass appears, giving Simon the choice to either kill it or flee from it back into the building. Simon continues on his journey home, attempting and failing to enter a subway station because he lacks a fuse. He goes to a nearby college to collect a fuse, however monsters ambush him upon finding it. 

Simon escapes to the station and enters it successfully where he, once again, encounters the doctor directly after he has murdered someone and gives chase where his progress is blocked by a door needing two more fuses. Simon enters the previously chained-up apartment and, after a long hallway where he hears a doctor describing an encounter with his patient and being attacked yet again, finds the fuses. While attempting to retrieve the fuses again to open a gate for a train, he enters another nightmare where he is chased through a maze by monsters hanging from the ceiling, escaping through a door that opens back up to a completely different hallway. 

Boarding the train, Simon is attacked by monsters yet again, and the train eventually crashes and derails, causing him to lose all of his belongings. As it is about to fall off a cliff, Simon escapes narrowly and finds himself in a dark forest. Deep in the forest, Simon discovers an asylum as the doctor enters. Simon finds the doctor behind a gate where the doctor orders him to hand him a new gun in exchange for letting him pass. Simon can either oblige or refuse, but regardless, the doctor ends up betraying Simon and shoots him, with a greater penalty to maximum health if Simon complied. Simon eventually kills the doctor after a gunfight.

Simon leaves the forest and rows through a lake to his hometown. He finally reaches his house and expects his mother to be waiting for him but the house is empty. He enters his bedroom and finds a book. Through a flashback, the player finds out that the entire story was a figment of Simon's imagination. After the car crash, Simon had become reliant on a wheelchair. Depressed, his therapist (who was the doctor in the game) advised him to document his feelings in a book. The character controlled throughout the game was a concocted version of Simon, and all the monsters represented the trauma in his mind. Cry of Fear has five different endings depending on the player's choices.
 If Carcass wasn't killed and Simon didn't give the gun to the doctor, he kills Sophie, his therapist, and then himself. He leaves a suicide note stating that he would have killed more people if it weren't for his disability and wishes that the people who find his body are haunted by it for the rest of their life. 
 If Carcass wasn't killed and Simon gave the gun to the doctor, he kills Sophie, then himself. In his suicide note, he apologizes to his therapist and thanks him for his help, explaining that he killed Sophie so that he could have her all to himself since he never got over her rejection.
 If Carcass was killed and Simon didn't give the gun to the doctor, he kills his doctor, then himself. In his suicide note, he states that the doctor's therapy only made things worse, and begs for Sophie not to know what he's done.
 If Carcass was killed and Simon gave the gun to the doctor, Simon, right before he kills himself, is confronted by Book Simon. The player, taking control of the real Simon, chases down and kills Book Simon in a shootout. Coming to his senses, Simon realizes he had a mental episode. Instead of taking his own life, he killed two police officers who were presumably checking in on him. Simon gets admitted into a mental hospital for the rest of his life, where his therapist continues to look after him. Sophie, despite how much Simon hurt her, visits him. Hopeful about the future and finally at peace with his demons, Simon finishes his book.
 Alternatively if you finished the game at least once before and place a mysterious package addressed to Simon in a mailbox, he arrives home to find it delivered. Opening it up to find pills, he takes them and ends up in a location from the team's previous game, Afraid of Monsters. At the end he is hit by a car driven by Afraid of Monster's protagonist, David Leatherhoff, revealed to be the one who hit Simon prior to the game. David, who still uses a lower quality model and talks entirely in text, apologizes to Simon, admits to being stoned, and flees the scene as Simon angrily yells for him to come back.

Reception

Cry of Fear has received positive reviews, with reviewers praising its overall atmosphere and unique setting. It has an average user score of 8.1 on Metacritic and 9.4 on ModDB.

References

External links 
Official Steam page

2012 video games
Cooperative video games
First-person adventure games
First-person shooters
Freeware games
GoldSrc mods
Psychological horror games
Video games developed in Sweden
Video games with commentaries
Windows games
Windows-only games
Video games about mental health
Video games about police officers
Video games set in Sweden
Video games with alternate endings
Multiplayer and single-player video games